Cerreti is an Italian surname. Notable people with the surname include:

Alberto Cerreti (1939–2019), Italian politician
Giulio Cerreti (1903–1985), Italian politician

Italian-language surnames